Colin Thain (born 20 January 1959) is professor of political science and a former head of the Department of Political Science and International Studies at the University of Birmingham. Born in Bedlington, Northumberland, Thain received a BA in economics (1981) and Ph.D. in government (1985) from the University of Manchester. He was previously based at the University of Ulster. Thain is currently also a visiting fellow at All Souls College and senior visiting research fellow in the Department of Politics and International Relations at the University of Oxford. In 1988, while he was a lecturer at the University of Exeter, Thain was awarded one of the first three Lloyd's Tercentenary Foundation Fellowships.

His research interests lie in the area of economic policy making, with a particular focus on HM Treasury and the Bank of England. His publications include an influential work in the study of the Treasury, The Treasury and Whitehall: The Planning and Control of Public Spending (co-authored with Maurice Wright, Clarendon Press, 1995), and he is currently working on a project on the evolution of the Treasury under the New Labour government, funded by the Economic and Social Research Council.

References

External links
 University of Birmingham homepage
 Personal homepage
 The Treasury under New Labour since 1997: The evolution of a British Institution
 

Academics of the University of Birmingham
Academics of Ulster University
British political scientists
Living people
Alumni of the University of Manchester
Academics of the University of Exeter
1959 births